Acar is a village in the Sason District, Batman Province, Turkey. The village is populated by Kurds of the Xiyan tribe and had a population of 472 in 2021.

The hamlets of Güneşli and Hasanlar are attached to the village.

The village has a Armenian population that converted to Islam in 1983.

References

Villages in Sason District

Kurdish settlements in Batman Province